"Push It" is the second single from rapper Rick Ross' debut album Port of Miami. It samples "Scarface (Push It to the Limit)" (keeping with the theme of the album) and the story of the video (directed by Benny Boom) has a very similar theme to the movie Scarface. It was produced by J. R. Rotem.

The official remix to this song features Bun B, Jadakiss, Styles P. and The Game, which samples "Scarface (Push It to the Limit)" more heavily than the original. A remix was released with Miami rapper Trina and Plies. There were also remixes released by Sean Kingston, one by Trey Songz. There was a freestyle over the same beat released by Harlem rappers Cam'Ron and Vado. The song was also featured on "The Big Game", the 36th episode of Criminal Minds.

Charts

Weekly charts

Year-end charts

Certifications

References

2006 singles
Music videos directed by Benny Boom
Rick Ross songs
Song recordings produced by J. R. Rotem
Songs written by Pete Bellotte
Songs written by Giorgio Moroder
Songs written by J. R. Rotem
Songs written by Rick Ross
Trap music songs
2006 songs

es:Push It
nl:Push It